Maurício Luiz de Souza (born 29 September 1988) is a Brazilian politician, former volleyball player, member of the Brazil men's national volleyball team, 2016 Olympic Champion, silver medallist of the 2018 World Championship, gold medallist of the 2019 World Cup, three–time South American Champion (2013, 2015, 2017), 2014 Turkish Champion. He was sacked from the Minas Tênis Clube and the national team in October 2021 after sharing a post about Jon Kent, the son of Superman, being revealed to be bisexual.

He later joined the Liberal Party in 2022. He participated as a candidate in the parliamentary elections in the same year, being elected as a federal deputy from the state of Minas Gerais.

Personal life

Maurício Souza is married to Isabella Saldanha Castro and has two children, a girl and a boy.

Statements about homosexuals

Souza has posted homophobic messages on his social networks in the past, which generated controversy. In 2014 he made a post against homosexuality but apologized after a public backlash. Another made in 2017 was removed ten hours later.

In 2021, Souza criticized the comic character Jonathan Samuel Kent, who in the DC Universe is the son of Superman/Clark Kent and Lois Lane, for being revealed as bisexual. After a negative reaction, Fiat and Gerdau, sponsors of Minas Tênis Clube, the team the athlete works for, demanded measures from the club's board of directors and repudiated the player's attitude. The sports team then decided to fine and temporarily remove Souza, in addition to stating that "the player's opinions do not represent the beliefs of the partner sports institution" and that he should recant. The organized supporters Independente Minas also released a statement in which it said it "will ignore the athlete Maurício Souza in social networks, games and demonstrations".

After the controversy, Souza published a message of retraction for the statements on his Twitter account. However, on October 27, 2021, the team terminated their contract with him. Renan Dal Zotto, coach of the Brazilian Men's Volleyball Team, said he "was disappointed" with the conduct of Maurício Souza and that "there is no room for homophobic professionals" in the selection. As a result, Souza lost his place within the national team. 20 federal deputies from 13 states and seven political parties lodged complaints against him with the Public Ministry of Minas Gerais.

Sporting achievements

Clubs
 CEV Champions League
  2013/2014 – with Halkbank Ankara
 CSV South American Club Championship
  Florianópolis 2009 – with Brasil Vôlei Clube
  Belo Horizonte 2013 – with Vivo/Minas
 National championships
 2013/2014  Turkish SuperCup, with Halkbank Ankara
 2013/2014  Turkish Cup, with Halkbank Ankara
 2013/2014  Turkish Championship, with Halkbank Ankara
 2014/2015  Brazilian Cup, with Vôlei Taubaté
 2019/2020  Brazilian SuperCup, with Vôlei Taubaté
 2020/2021  Brazilian SuperCup, with Vôlei Taubaté

Individual awards
 2013: Pan American Cup – Best Middle Blocker
 2013: Pan American Cup – Best Blocker
 2016: FIVB World League – Best Middle Blocker
 2020: CSV South American Club Championship – Best Middle Blocker
 2021: FIVB Nations League – Best Middle Blocker

Politics

Souza is a public supporter of Jair Bolsonaro. Shortly after the defeat of the Brazilian volleyball team at the 2020 Summer Olympics in Tokyo, he was received by Jair Bolsonaro and his son, Eduardo Bolsonaro (PSL), at Palácio do Planalto, in Brasília. On the occasion, Souza presented the politicians with t-shirts of the Brazilian volleyball team. His support for the Bolsonaro family had been known since 2018, when he and Wallace de Souza, his national team partner, went viral on the internet after posing for a photo in which they made, with their fingers, the number 17, which represented Bolsonaro in the ballot boxes during the 2018 Brazilian presidential election.

After his firing for his homophobic comments, Souza joined the Liberal Party in March 2022 to run for the position of federal deputy for Minas Gerais in the 2022 election. Souza said that he was running because there was a need for more officials who supported President Jair Bolsonaro. He won by a margin of over 83,000 votes.

References

External links
 Player profile at Olympic.org
 Player profile at CEV.eu
 Player profile at WorldofVolley.com
 Player profile at Volleybox.net
 Maurício Souza on Facebook
 Maurício Souza on Instagram

1988 births
Living people
Conservatism in Brazil
Sportspeople from Minas Gerais
Brazilian men's volleyball players
Olympic volleyball players of Brazil
Volleyball players at the 2016 Summer Olympics
Medalists at the 2016 Summer Olympics
Volleyball players at the 2020 Summer Olympics
Olympic medalists in volleyball
Olympic gold medalists for Brazil
Pan American Games medalists in volleyball
Pan American Games gold medalists for Brazil
Pan American Games silver medalists for Brazil
Volleyball players at the 2011 Pan American Games
Medalists at the 2011 Pan American Games
Volleyball players at the 2015 Pan American Games
Medalists at the 2015 Pan American Games
Universiade medalists in volleyball
Medalists at the 2011 Summer Universiade
Universiade bronze medalists for Brazil
Brazilian expatriate sportspeople in Turkey
Expatriate volleyball players in Turkey
Halkbank volleyball players
Middle blockers
Liberal Party (Brazil, 2006) politicians